Jan Muršak (born 20 January 1988) is a professional Slovenian ice hockey player for Frölunda HC of the Swedish Hockey League (SHL). Muršak first played hockey in Slovenia as a member of HDK Maribor before he left to spend one season in the Czech junior league. He was then selected by the Detroit Red Wings in the 2006 NHL Entry Draft and moved to the major junior Ontario Hockey League (OHL) and played for two teams, the Saginaw Spirit and Belleville Bulls. After finishing his junior career Muršak then joined the Red Wings American Hockey League (AHL) affiliate, the Grand Rapids Griffins in 2008.

Playing career

European career and juniors
Muršak developed his skills in his hometown ice hockey club HDK Maribor where he played until the age of 17. As a youth, he played in the 2001 and 2002 Quebec International Pee-Wee Hockey Tournaments with a team from Slovenia. He later transferred to Czech club HC Ceské Budejovice for which he played for a season in CZE-U20 youth development league.

In 2006 he was selected by the Detroit Red Wings as the 182nd overall draft pick (6th round). During the same year Muršak was drafted by the Saginaw Spirit in 1st Round of the 2006 CHL Import Draft, 33rd overall. He had a successful first season for Saginaw which earned him a playoff call up for the Grand Rapids Griffins, AHL affiliate to the Detroit Red Wings. In his second OHL season, Muršak was traded from the Saginaw Spirit, to the Belleville Bulls where he stayed until the end of the season, before moving on to play regularly for Grand Rapids in the AHL.

Detroit Red Wings
Muršak signed a contract with the Detroit Red Wings in April 2007. Since his draft in 2006 he has made appearances for the Red Wings during training camps. On 26 December 2010 it was announced by Detroit that Muršak was called up to the team to fill in after an ankle injury of Danny Cleary. He made his NHL career debut on 28 December 2010 in a game against the Colorado Avalanche, thus becoming the second Slovenian, after Anže Kopitar of the Los Angeles Kings, to play in the NHL. Muršak scored his first NHL goal on 10 January 2011, also in a game against the Avalanche against Peter Budaj. On 17 February 2011, Muršak signed a new two-year contract with the Red Wings.

Due to the 2012 NHL lockout, Muršak signed a temporary contract with the Slovenian hockey team HDD Olimpija Ljubljana of the EBEL league. In 30 games with Olimpija, he excelled with 48 points, before returning for the start of the shortened 2012–13 season with the Red Wings. On opening night, he was again setback by injury, after hurting his collarbone in a 6–0 defeat against the St. Louis Blues.

On his return to health, and with limited opportunity with the Red Wings, Muršak was placed on waivers on 22 February 2013. He was assigned to the Griffins for the remainder of the season.

Return to Europe
As an impending free agent, Mursak subsequently moved to Amur Khabarovsk of the Kontinental Hockey League.

After re-establishing his offensive presence in three and half seasons with CSKA Moscow, Muršak left the club as a free agent and opted to continue in the KHL in signing a one-year contract with Torpedo Nizhny Novgorod on May 1, 2017.

Mursak then played for Frolunda HC in the SHL and scored a brace on his first team game debut against HV71 on January 11, 2018. Mursak currently plays for SC Bern in the NL.

International play
Muršak was chosen to compete on the Slovenia national junior team in the 2008 World Junior Ice Hockey Championships (Division I) in Latvia, where he scored one goal and two assists and was named the best forward of the tournament. He made his debut for the Slovenian senior team at the 2010 Division I Championships, held in the Slovenian capital, Ljubljana. In 2014, Muršak represented Slovenia at their first appearance at the Olympics. Muršak also represented Slovenia at the 2018 Winter Olympics in Pyeonchang, most notably coming on as a substitute in the last minutes of the game against USA, and scoring two late goals to win them the game.

Career statistics

Regular season and playoffs

International

Awards and honours

References

External links

1988 births
Living people
Amur Khabarovsk players
Belleville Bulls players
SC Bern players
Detroit Red Wings draft picks
Detroit Red Wings players
Grand Rapids Griffins players
Motor České Budějovice players
HC CSKA Moscow players
Frölunda HC players
HDD Olimpija Ljubljana players
HDK Maribor players
Ice hockey players at the 2014 Winter Olympics
Ice hockey players at the 2018 Winter Olympics
Olympic ice hockey players of Slovenia
Saginaw Spirit players
Slovenian ice hockey left wingers
Sportspeople from Maribor
Slovenian expatriate sportspeople in the United States
Slovenian expatriate sportspeople in Russia
Torpedo Nizhny Novgorod players
Slovenian expatriate sportspeople in Sweden
Slovenian expatriate sportspeople in Switzerland
Slovenian expatriate sportspeople in the Czech Republic
Slovenian expatriate sportspeople in Canada
Expatriate ice hockey players in the United States
Expatriate ice hockey players in Russia
Expatriate ice hockey players in Sweden
Expatriate ice hockey players in Switzerland
Expatriate ice hockey players in the Czech Republic
Expatriate ice hockey players in Canada
Slovenian expatriate ice hockey people